Usta Köy is a village in the Dikmen district of Sinop Province, Turkey.

Villages in Sinop Province